Sdot Dan Regional Council (Mo'atza Azorit Sdot Dan, lit. Dan Fields Regional Council) is a regional council in the Central District of Israel. Founded in 1952, it borders Ben Gurion International Airport and Or Yehuda to the north, Hevel Modi'in Regional Council and Lod to the east, Be'er Ya'akov and Ramla to the south and Beit Dagan and Rishon LeZion to the west.

It was named Lod Valley Regional Council (Mo'atza Azorit Emek Lod) until 2018.

List of communities
The council covers eight moshavim and two villages;
Moshavim
Ahi'ezer · Ganot · Hemed · Mishmar HaShiva · Nir Tzvi · Tzafria · Yagel · Zeitan
Other villages
Kfar Chabad
Unofficial settlements (Arab)
Dahmash

External links
Official website 

 
Regional councils in Israel